Tallinna Jalgpalli Klubi Legion, or simply TJK Legion, is an Estonian football club, based in Tallinn. On 4 January 2008, Tallinna Jalgpalli Klubi and Tallinna SK Legion merged into this club. The club competes in Esiliiga, the second-highest division in the Estonian football.

TJK Legion's predecessor is the two-time Estonian champion Tallinna Jalgpalli Klubi.

History

Predecessor Tallinna JK 

Tallinna Jalgpalli Klubi, or TJK in short, was founded on 5 May 1921 and were one of the founding members of the Estonian Football Championship in 1921. TJK became the first football club in Estonia to have a foreign coach, appointing Hungarian Franz Woggenhuber as coach in 1922.

The club became Estonian champions twice, winning the championship in 1926 and 1928, also later winning the Estonian Cup in 1939. TJK was the home club for a number of Estonian internationals, with Eduard Ellmann-Eelma being the most well-known.

Tallinna Jalgpalli Klubi was disbanded in 1941 due to World War II and re-established in 2001, after which the club was renowned for its successful youth system and was the starting point for famous Estonian internationals Konstantin Vassiljev, Tarmo Kink and Dmitri Kruglov.

Merger into Tallinna JK Legion 
In 2008, Tallinna JK and SK Legion merged and the club was named Tallinna JK Legion. Legion continued to focus on youth football. In 2017, TJK Legion set their sights on improving their senior football team's situation, which at the time played in II Liiga, the fourth tier of Estonian football. In consecutive years, TJK Legion won II Liiga, Esiliiga B and Esiliiga and were promoted to Meistriliiga for the 2020 season.

In their first season in Meistriliiga, the club finished 7th. In the following 2021 season, Legion finished in 5th place and accumulated 40 points in 32 matches. However, due to serious problems in the licensing process, the Estonian FA announced that Legion will start the 2022 season with −4 points and imposed a restriction on signing and registering new players. Despite the 4 point deduction and unexperienced young squad, Legion finished the season in 9th place and avoided direct relegation. However, on 23 December 2022 it was announced that TJK Legion will not continue in the Premium Liiga due to financial difficulties and will play the following season in the second division Esiliiga.

Players

Current squad
As of 28 July 2022.For season transfers, see transfers winter 2021–22 and transfers summer 2022.''

Out on loan

Kit manufacturers and shirt sponsors

Personnel

Current technical staff

Managerial history

Statistics

League and Cup

Honours
2014 – Gothia Cup (Boys 2003)

References

External links
 Official website

Football clubs in Tallinn
Association football clubs established in 2007
2007 establishments in Estonia
Meistriliiga clubs